Braintree Sixth Form is a school Sixth Form centre for educating 16- to 19-year-olds in Braintree, Essex, England. It is located approximately 15 miles east of Stansted Airport in north Essex.

Up until 1981 post 16 education in Braintree took place in Sixth Forms located in each of the town's schools. In 1981 Essex County Council closed the separate Sixth Forms at the Schools in Braintree and moved post 16 education to a new purpose-built FE (Further Education) college, Braintree College, later becoming part of the Colchester Institute. The opening of Braintree Sixth Form in 2009 marked a return to school-based Sixth Form education in Braintree.

Development and opening 
In 2006 Notley High School was awarded High Performing Specialist Status because of its examination results. Schools with High Performing Status are allowed to take on a new specialism and so the school chose to specialise in vocational learning (now called Applied Learning). This allowed the school to exercise the legal presumption in favour of opening a Sixth Form.

A decision was taken by the governors of Notley High School that the new Sixth Form should not be a Sixth Form for just Notley students, it should instead be for the benefit of the whole of Braintree. A decision was therefore taken to name the new Sixth Form as "Braintree Sixth Form."

The LSC (Learning and Skills Council) gave approval for the opening of the Sixth Form in December 2006 and Essex County Council formally approved the plan on 16 January 2007. The LSC then committed approximately £6 million to fund the costs of building and developing the new Sixth Form building, subject to formal planning consent which was given on 26 October 2007.

The new Sixth Form building was constructed on land adjacent to Notley High School. The building project took place between March 2008 and August 2009 and the completed building was handed over in August 2009. The Sixth Form formally opened with its student body on Wednesday 2 September 2009. The formal opening of the Sixth Form took place on Wednesday 7 October 2009 with Dorothy Gardner, the first headteacher of Notley High School and Angela Comfort, the first chair of Governors of Notley High School, carrying out the unveiling of the commemorative plaque.

The four schools collaborating for the benefit of Braintree Sixth Form are: Notley High School, Tabor Academy, Honywood Community Science School and Alec Hunter Academy. The schools provide the staff for the Sixth Form.

The curriculum 
The Sixth Form curriculum includes A levels and the IB Diploma. The subjects available each year are listed on the Sixth Form website.

In addition to academic programmes the Sixth Form offers enrichment opportunities which include the Duke of Edinburgh's Award (D of E) and a range of voluntary options.

The building and facilities
The Sixth Form building contains two purpose built science labs, two large ICT rooms, fifteen general purpose classrooms, a Sixth Form library, cafe and a large theatre which is shared with the Braintree Arts Theatre.

Admissions and applications 
The Sixth Form is oversubscribed. There were approximately 300 applications for the 150 places available in September 2009.

References

Braintree Sixth Form, Essex
Sixth form colleges in Essex
Educational institutions established in 2009
Braintree, Essex
2009 establishments in England